Nemognatha lurida is a species of blister beetle in the family Meloidae. It is found in Central America and North America.

Subspecies
These two subspecies belong to the species Nemognatha lurida:
 Nemognatha lurida apicalis LeConte, 1853
 Nemognatha lurida lurida (LeConte, 1853)

References

Further reading

 
 

Meloidae
Articles created by Qbugbot
Beetles described in 1853